Cyperus sahelii is a species of sedge that is native to parts of Niger.

See also 
 List of Cyperus species

References 

sahelii
Plants described in 2005
Flora of Niger